The 1996–97 NBA season  was the Nets' 30th season in the National Basketball Association, and 21st season in East Rutherford, New Jersey. In the 1996 NBA draft, the Nets selected Kerry Kittles out of Villanova with the eighth pick. In the off-season, the team signed free agents Robert Pack, Tony Massenburg, Xavier McDaniel, who played in Greece during the previous season, and David Benoit, who missed the entire season with a ruptured Achilles tendon. Under new head coach John Calipari, the Nets continued to struggle losing their first five games of the season, which included two games against the Orlando Magic in Tokyo, Japan. The team held a 13–33 record at the All-Star break.

At midseason, the Nets traded Pack along with Shawn Bradley, Khalid Reeves and second-year forward Ed O'Bannon to the Dallas Mavericks in exchange for Sam Cassell, Jim Jackson, Chris Gatling, Eric Montross and George McCloud, who never played with the Nets and was dealt to the Los Angeles Lakers in exchange for Joe Kleine. Gatling only played just three games after the trade due to an ear infection, and was out for the remainder of the season. The Nets ended their season with a 26–56 record, finishing fifth in the Atlantic Division.

Kendall Gill averaged 21.8 points, 6.1 rebounds and 1.9 steals per game, while Kittles averaged 16.4 points and 1.9 steals per game, and was selected to the NBA All-Rookie Second Team. In addition, Jayson Williams continued to show improvement averaging 13.4 points, and leading the team with 13.5 rebounds per game, before sitting out the remainder of the season with a thumb injury after 41 games, while Massenburg contributed 7.2 points and 6.5 rebounds per game, and McDaniel averaged 5.6 points and 5.1 rebounds per game off the bench. Kittles finished in fifth place in Rookie of the Year voting, while Gatling finished in third place in Sixth Man of the Year voting.

Following the season, Jackson and Montross were both traded to the Philadelphia 76ers, while Massenburg signed as a free agent with the Boston Celtics, but was then traded to the Vancouver Grizzlies, and Kleine signed with the Chicago Bulls.

Draft picks

Roster

Roster notes
 Small forward David Benoit missed the entire season due to a ruptured Achilles tendon.

Regular season

Season standings

z – clinched division title
y – clinched division title
x – clinched playoff spot

Record vs. opponents

Game log

Player statistics

Regular season

Player Statistics Citation:

Awards and records
 Kerry Kittles, NBA All-Rookie Team 2nd Team
 Shawn Bradley, NBA 1996-1997 League Leader in Blocks

Transactions

References

See also
 1996–97 NBA season

New Jersey Nets season
New Jersey Nets seasons
New Jersey Nets
New Jersey Nets
20th century in East Rutherford, New Jersey
Meadowlands Sports Complex